Targovishte Province (transliterated Oblast Tǎrgovište, former name Targovishte okrug) is a province in northeastern Bulgaria, named after its main city - Targovishte. As of December 2009, it has a population of 129,675 inhabitants.

Municipalities

The Targovishte Province contains 5 municipalities (singular: община, obshtina - plural: общини, obshtini). The following table shows the names of each municipality in English and Cyrillic, the main town (in bold) or village, and the population of each as of December 2009.

Demographics

The following table represents the change of the population in the province after World War II:

Ethnic groups

Total population (2011 census): 120,818

Ethnic groups (2011 census):
Identified themselves: 106,800 persons:
Bulgarians: 58,371 (54.65%)
Turks:  38,231 (35.80%)
Romani: 7,767 (7.27%)
Others and indefinable: 2,431 (2.28%)
A further 14,000 persons in Targovishte Province did not declare their ethnic group at the 2011 census.

Religion

Religious adherence in the province according to 2001 census:

Technical Infrastructure
The length of the road network is 1,171.3 km, 77.6 km of which are first class roads. There are two railway stations on the major railway line Sofia- Gorna Oryahovitsa - Varna.

However, it is not being used because of a lack of financial resources.

Towns and villages 
The place names in bold have the status of town (in Bulgarian: град, transliterated as grad). Other localities have the status of village (in Bulgarian: село, transliterated as selo). The names of localities are transliterated in Latin alphabet followed in parentheses by the original name in Bulgarian Cyrillic script (which links to the corresponding Bulgarian Wikipedia article).

Antonovo municipality 
The Antonovo municipality has one town (in bold) and 56 villages:

Omurtag municipality 
The Omurtag municipality has one town (in bold) and 41 villages:

Opaka municipality 
The Opaka municipality has one town (in bold) and 5 villages:

Popovo municipality 
The Popovo municipality has one town (in bold) and 34 villages:

Targovishte municipality 
The Targovishte municipality has one town (in bold) and 51 villages:

See also
Provinces of Bulgaria
List of villages in Targovishte Province

References

External links 
 Targovishte Province Web Site

 
Provinces of Bulgaria
Turkish communities outside Turkey